The Senegal national under-16 basketball team is a national basketball team of Senegal, governed by the Fédération Sénégalaise de Basket-Ball.
It represents the country in international under-16 (under age 16) basketball competitions.

The team appeared at the 2009 FIBA Africa Under-16 Championship qualification stage.

See also
Senegal men's national basketball team
Senegal men's national under-19 basketball team
Senegal women's national under-16 basketball team

References

External links
Archived records of Senegal team participations

Basketball in Senegal
Basketball teams in Senegal
Men's national under-16 basketball teams
Basketball